Dresda (minor planet designation: 263 Dresda) is a typical Main belt asteroid. It belongs to the Koronis family of asteroids.

It has a lightly coloured surface and likely is not composed of carbonaceous materials, but is similar in composition as another Koronis family member, 243 Ida.

It was discovered by Johann Palisa on 3 November 1886 in Vienna.

The asteroid's name derives from the German city of Dresden.

References

External links
 
 
The Asteroid Orbital Elements Database
Minor Planet Discovery Circumstances
Asteroid Lightcurve Data File

Koronis asteroids
Dresda
Dresda
S-type asteroids (SMASS)
18861103